Natasha Poonawalla (née Aurora born 26 November 1981) is an Indian businesswoman, chairperson of the Villoo Poonawalla Foundation; the executive director of the Serum Institute of India, one of the largest vaccine manufacturing companies in the world by number of doses produced; the director of the Poonawalla Science Park in the Netherlands; and the director of Villoo Poonawalla Racing and Breeding Pvt Ltd. She is a fashion enthusiast.

Early life and education
She was born on 26 November 1981 to Pramesh Aurora and his wife, Minnie Aurora. She has an older brother Amit. She grew up in Pune, India. She did her basic schooling at St. Mary's School, Pune, followed by a bachelor's degree from Savitribai Phule Pune University. In 2004, she received a master's degree from the London School of Economics.

Personal life 
Natasha married Adar Poonawalla in 2006. She had met him at a new year's party in Goa hosted by Vijay Mallya. They have two sons, Cyrus and Darius.

References

External links 
 Villoo Poonawalla Charitable Foundation

Businesspeople from Pune
Indian businesspeople in the pharmaceutical industry
Living people
1981 births
Businesswomen from Maharashtra
21st-century Indian businesswomen
21st-century Indian businesspeople